The doubles competition at the 2022 FIL European Luge Championships was held on 22 January 2022.

Results
The first run was held at 08:43 and the second run at 10:07.

References

Doubles